Simon James Cook (born 15 January 1977) is an English former professional cricketer who was the head coach of the Hong Kong cricket team between 2015 and 2019. He was a right-arm medium-fast bowler who played for Middlesex and Kent County Cricket Clubs between 1999 and 2012. Cook batted right handed.

Cook was born at Oxford. His brother, Adam, has played Minor counties and List A cricket for Oxfordshire.

Cricket career
Cook initially played in 1996 for Cumnor in Oxfordshire before a year later being signed by Middlesex along with Andrew Strauss. After suffering from shin splints and stress fractures he gradually established himself as a front-line bowler in the County Championship. In 2004 he took 39 wickets in the National League, equalling the record of Adam Hollioake.

After seven years at Middlesex, Cook signed a contract with Kent at the end of 2004. He became a regular first teamer, mostly taking the new ball. He won the 2007 Twenty20 Cup and the 2009 County Championship Division Two title with the county. He retired from county cricket at the end of the 2012 county season.

Coaching career 
He had completed his coaching training to the highest level whilst still a player and took a role coaching France before the 2013 European T20 Championship. He then took a role as head coach of the Hong Kong Cricket Club before becoming the bowling coach of the Hong Kong national cricket team in 2013.

In 2015 he was appointed the interim head coach of the Hong Kong national side. He went on to be appointed to the role in 2016. His time as head coach saw the side record their first One Day International and first-class victories in 2015, take part in the 2016 ICC World Twenty20 and record a first victory over an ICC Full Member, beating Afghanistan in 2018. The team won its first international tournament in 10 years under Cook's leadership in 2018, winning the 2018 Asia Cup Qualifier tournament.

Cook left the Hong Kong post in July 2019, returning to the UK. He was appointed as specialist bowling coach at Kent in September, taking up the role in October.

References

External links

1977 births
Living people
English cricketers
Middlesex cricketers
Kent cricketers
Coaches of the Hong Kong national cricket team
British expatriates in Hong Kong
Cricketers from Oxford